Leo van Doeselaar (born 1954, Goes) is a Dutch classical organist and conductor.

Leo van Doeselaar studied the organ (with Albert de Klerk) and piano (with Jan Wijn) at the Amsterdam Sweelinck Conservatory. He was awarded by the Prix d'Excellence in organ in 1979.

He has appeared with many baroque ensembles including those led by Philippe Herreweghe, Ton Koopman, Gustav Leonhardt, Jos van Veldhoven and Andrew Parrott. He was the organ soloist with the Royal Concertgebouw Orchestra, recorded by Decca - this recording received a Grammy Award.

In 1995 he was appointed Professor at the Universität der Künste in Berlin.

External links 
 Bach-Cantatas.com
 Official sites
 

1954 births
Living people
Dutch classical organists
Male classical organists
Dutch conductors (music)
Male conductors (music)
Dutch performers of early music
Conservatorium van Amsterdam alumni
Academic staff of the Berlin University of the Arts
People from Goes
21st-century conductors (music)
21st-century organists
21st-century male musicians